Revenge of the Musketeers ( / D'Artagnan vs the Three Musketeers) is a 1963 Italian adventure film directed by Fulvio Tului.

Cast
 Fernando Lamas as d'Artagnan
 Gloria Milland as Olimpia Mancini 
 Roberto Risso as Aramis
 Walter Barnes as Porthos
 Franco Fantasia as Athos
 Folco Lulli as Cardinal Mazarin
 Andreina Paul as Queen Anne
 Gabriele Antonini as King Charles II
 Renzo Palmer 
 Piero Lulli 
 Ignazio Leone 
 Franco Ressel 
 Benito Stefanelli

References

External links

Revenge of the Musketeers at Variety Distribution

1964 films
1964 adventure films
Italian adventure films
Italian swashbuckler films
Films based on Twenty Years After
Cultural depictions of Cardinal Mazarin
Cultural depictions of Charles II of England
1960s Italian-language films
1960s Italian films